The Unique Property Reference Number (UPRN) is a unique alphanumeric identifier (a geocode) for every spatial address in Great Britain and can be found in Ordnance Survey's AddressBase products.

A UPRN provides a comprehensive, complete, consistent identifier throughout a property’s life cycle from planning permission through to demolition. For example, the UPRN for 10 Downing Street is 100023336956, and that for Bristol Central Library is 000000199356. The UPRN contains no attribution or information (for example coordinate position) about the property.

UPRNs and USRNs (Unique Street Reference Numbers) are managed by GeoPlace, a joint venture between the Local Government Association and Ordnance Survey to create a definitive national databases of addresses and streets, now available under an Open Government Licence (OGL).

The Government Digital Service has mandated the UPRN and USRN as "the public sector standard for referencing and sharing property and street information".

ONSUD 
The Office for National Statistics (ONS) Geography group produces the ONS UPRN Directory (ONSUD) which relates the UPRN for each postal address in Great Britain to a range of current statutory administrative, electoral, health and other area geographies. It also links UPRNs to 2011 Census Output Areas (OA) and Super Output Areas (SOA). It is designed to complement the Ordnance Survey's AddressBase location intelligence products.  

The ONSUD is issued every six weeks, and is available for free download in comma separated variable (CSV) format from the ONS Open Geography Portal. The content is broken down by region, with each being supplied as a separate file (with a file each for Wales and Scotland). 

The ONSUD reflects UPRNs using information supplied on a 6-weekly basis by Ordnance Surveys's AddressBase. In most instances, it relates UPRNs to geographic areas as at the end of the preceding year. The ONSUD uses the Government Statistical Service (GSS) standard 9-character codes throughout and lookup files linking these codes to statutory area names are provided.

Data fields 
Each record in the ONSUD contains the following fields:
Unique Property Reference Number 
Non-metropolitan county / metropolitan county / Inner London, Outer London
County Electoral Division
Local Authority District (LAD) / unitary authority (UA) / metropolitan district (MD) / London borough (LB) / (Scottish) council area (CA)
Electoral ward / division
Former Strategic Health Authority (SHA) / Local Health Board (LHB) / Health Board (HB)
Country
Region (former GOR) 
Westminster parliamentary constituency
European Electoral Region (EER)
Travel to Work Area (TTWA)
LAU2 area
National park
2011 Census Output Area (OA)
2011 Census Lower Layer Super Output Area (LSOA)/ Data Zone (DZ)
Middle Layer Super Output Area (MSOA) / Intermediate Zone (IZ)
Parish / community
2011 Census Workplace Zone (WZ)
Clinical Commissioning Group (CCG) / Local Health Board (LHB) / Community Health Partnership (CHP)
Built-up Area (BUA)
Built-up Area Sub-division (BUASD)
2011 Census rural-urban classification 
2011 Census Output Area classification (OAC)
Local Enterprise Partnership (LEP) - first instance
Local Enterprise Partnership (LEP) - second instance
Police Force Area (PFA) 
Index of Multiple Deprivation (IMD)

See also
TOID

References

External links

 Open Geography Portal
 Map of UPRNs overlaid on OpenStreetMap data

Office for National Statistics
Demographics of England
Demographics of Wales
Demographics of Scotland
Geodemographic databases
Geographical databases in the United Kingdom
National statistical services
Statistical organisations in the United Kingdom
Geocodes